This is a list of notable fish and chip restaurants which are renowned for, or whose main dish is, fish and chips. Fish and chips is a hot dish of English origin, consisting of battered fish, commonly Atlantic cod or haddock and deep-fried chips. It is a common take-away food. A common side dish is mushy peas.

A fish and chip shop, colloquially known as a 'chippy' in the UK and 'chipper' in Ireland, is an outlet that predominantly sells the English dish of fish and chips. It is usually a takeaway operation, although some have limited seating facilities.

Fish and chip restaurants

Canada
Joey's Seafood Restaurants, 44 locations, based in Alberta

Ireland
 Leo Burdock – Originally only located in the Christchurch area, now a Dublin chain of 'Chippers'.

United Kingdom

 Anstruther Fish Bar – located in Anstruther, a fishing village in the East Neuk of Fife, Scotland
 The Ashvale – a chain of fish and chip restaurants and takeaways in the north-east of Scotland
 The Fryer's Delight – a traditional cabbie's favourite in Theobald's Road, London
 Harry Ramsden's – a chain based in the United Kingdom which offers fish and chips and assorted themed dishes
 Kerbisher & Malt – a new chain in London
 Seashell of Lisson Grove – a standalone fish and chip restaurant located in Marylebone, London.
 Magpie Café – located in Whitby, North Yorkshire, England, and  established in 1937, but its building dated back to the 18th century, when it was a merchant's house
 Papa's – Won a BBC contest, The Best of British Takeaways, in 2017. Papa's Fish and Chips in Cleethorpes is the world's second largest fish and chip shop with over 500 seats.
 Binley Mega Chippy – a fish and chip restaurant located in Binley, Coventry that gained mass popularity after becoming viral on the social media platform TikTok in May 2022.

United States
 Arthur Treacher's – a formerly national fast food seafood restaurant chain in the United States; now down to one location in Cuyahoga Falls, Ohio.
 Batterfish – restaurant in Portland, Oregon (previously Los Angeles)
 Captain D's – a chain of fast-casual restaurants in the United States specializing in fish and chips and other seafood
 H. Salt Esquire – a California fast food chain that specializes in fish and chips
 Ivar's - a chain based in Seattle; some are full-service restaurants, some are stand-up bars, some are in malls, and some are fast-food restaurants
 Long John Silver's – a fast food chain based in the United States.
 Portland Fish Market (Portland, Oregon)
 Skippers Seafood & Chowder House – a fast food chain based in the U.S. state of Washington

See also

 List of seafood restaurants
 Lists of restaurants
 National Federation of Fish Friers

References

 
Fish and chip